The Leases for Mills (Ireland) Act 1851 was an act of the Parliament of the United Kingdom. The act extended the powers of various members of the clergy and landowners to authorise and lease their land to build watermills to Ireland, which was previously omitted. The act received Royal Assent on 11 April 1851.

Provisions
The provisions of the act include:
Extending the powers conferred in the Exportation Act 1785 to Ireland.
Powers were given to bishops and members of the clergy, governors and fellows of hospitals or colleges, and anyone "in possession in Law or Equity of an Estate in Fee Tail or ... in trust" to lease their land to others for the building of mills or associated infrastructure.

Repeal
All parts of the Act still in effect were repealed by the Land and Conveyancing Law Reform Act 2009 of the Irish Parliament.

References

United Kingdom Acts of Parliament 1851
1851 in British law
Irish law